Bernd Eichinger (11 April 194924 January 2011) was a German film producer, director, and screenwriter.

Life and career 
Eichinger was born in Neuburg an der Donau. He attended the University of Television and Film Munich in the 1970s and bought a stake in the fledgling studio company Neue Constantin Film in 1979, becoming its executive director. Under his leadership, Constantin Film evolved into one of the most successful German film businesses. As of 2005, he was chairman of the supervisory board and still owned a substantial stake in the company. Eichinger also produced some movies independently (for example, Downfall). One of Eichinger's last films was about the left-wing terrorist group Red Army Faction (RAF) and based on the book Der Baader Meinhof Komplex ("The Baader-Meinhof Complex") by Stefan Aust.

The range of genres of films, for television and the big screen, was unusually varied. He produced a 3D zombie movie, Resident Evil: Afterlife; to Atomised, a film adaptation of novel by French star writer and social critic  Michel Houellebecq. He was an incredibly prolific film maker, with almost 100 films to his credit.

Eichinger was known as tenacious. It took him 20 years to convince Patrick Süskind, the German author of Perfume:The Story of a Murderer, to trust him with the rights to make the international bestseller into a film. In 2006, the film was released, grossing $135 million worldwide.

In the 1980s, Eichinger obtained the film rights to the Fantastic Four and Silver Surfer, decades before making movies based on Marvel comics was trending.

In 1991, he was a co-founder of Summit, the Los Angeles-based production and film sales company. Due to the success of Twilight, Summit eventually became Summit Entertainment.

Family 

Eichinger was married to Katja Hofmann, a journalist. He had a daughter from a previous relationship, Nina Eichinger, an actress and TV presenter.

Death 
Eichinger died of a heart attack in Los Angeles on 24 January 2011 at the age of 61.

Awards 
1984 Bavarian Film Awards, Best Producing
1986 Bavarian Film Awards, Best Producing
1993 Bavarian Film Awards, Best Producing

Selected filmography
Bernd Eichinger's best known films include:

References

External links 

 

1949 births
2011 deaths
People from Neuburg an der Donau
Mass media people from Bavaria
University of Television and Film Munich alumni
Recipients of the Cross of the Order of Merit of the Federal Republic of Germany